Asthulu Anthasthulu is a 1988 Indian Telugu-language masala film, produced by Smt. Sunitha Reddy on Sunitha Enterprises banner and directed by Bairisetty Bhaskara Rao. Starring Rajendra Prasad, Chandra Mohan and Ramya Krishna, with music composed by Ilaiyaraaja. The film is remake of Tamil film Muthal Vasantham (1986).

Plot 

The rivalry between two people Kota Tirupati (Kota Srinivasa Rao) & Pulikante Papa Rayudu (Charan Raj), splits a village into two. Sivaiah (Chandra Mohan) who runs a boat, always fights against their dictatorship and tries to protect the villagers. Kishtaiah (Rajendra Prasad) orphan innocent guy enters the village when Sivaiah gives him shelter and treats him as his own brother. Meanwhile, Kishtaiah gets the job in Tirupathi Naidu's house, and his only daughter Radha (Ramya Krishna) falls for him. Tirupathi Naidu learns it, becomes furious, and whips Kishtaiah in public. Here Sivaiah & his wife Gowri (Mahalakshmi) comes for his protection; with their help, Radha & Kishtaiah elope. But unfortunately, they get caught, and Tirupathi Naidu exacts gruesome vengeance, by chopping off Sivaiah's arms, and Gowri is raped by his goons. He also accuses Kishtaiah of raping and abducting Radha. In court, Radha says he is guilty. After having served his term in jail, he seeks vengeance. At the same time, he is confronted by another rival, Papa Rayudu.

Cast 
Rajendra Prasad as Kishtaiah
Chandra Mohan as Sivaiah
Ramya Krishna as Radha
Kota Srinivasa Rao as Kota Tirupati Naidu
Charan Raj as Pulikante Papa Rayudu
Prabhakar Reddy as Gangulu
Rallapalli as Kalahasthi
Saradhi
Mada
KK Sarma as Wizard
Bhemiswara Rao
Mahalakshmi as Gowri
Shubha as Annapurna
Mamatha as Gangulu's wife

Soundtrack 
Music was composed by Ilaiyaraaja.

References

External links 
 

1980s masala films
1980s Telugu-language films
1988 films
Films scored by Ilaiyaraaja
Telugu remakes of Tamil films